Daniel Nussbaumer (born 29 November 1999) is an Austrian professional footballer who plays for Liga Portugal 2 club Académico de Viseu.

Club career
He made his Austrian Football Bundesliga debut for SC Rheindorf Altach on 28 May 2017 in a game against FC Red Bull Salzburg. In 2018 he signed up for the German club VfB Stuttgart II with a contract until June 2020.

On 30 August 2021, he moved to Académico de Viseu in Portugal.

Personal life
Nussbaumer is the cousin of Lars Nussbaumer, who is also a professional footballer.

References

External links
 

1999 births
Living people
People from Bregenz District
Austrian footballers
Austria under-21 international footballers
Association football midfielders
SC Rheindorf Altach players
VfB Stuttgart II players
Académico de Viseu F.C. players
Austrian Football Bundesliga players
Regionalliga players
Austrian expatriate footballers
Austrian expatriate sportspeople in Germany
Expatriate footballers in Germany
Austrian expatriate sportspeople in Portugal
Expatriate footballers in Portugal
Liga Portugal 2 players
Footballers from Vorarlberg